Hales Grove (formerly, Monroe and Monroeville) is an unincorporated community in Mendocino County, California.

The Monroe post office opened in 1897, and after several moves closed in 1912.

References

Unincorporated communities in California
Unincorporated communities in Mendocino County, California